Booin-Zahra (also Romanized as Bū’īn Zahrā; also known as Booin, also Romanized as Bū’īn and Būyīn) is a city and capital of Buin Zahra County, Qazvin Province, Iran. At the 2011 census its population was 18,000. The people of Buin Zahra speak Azerbaijani Turkish.

See also 

 Buein Zahra Technical University

References 

Buin Zahra County
Cities in Qazvin Province